Andrew M. Brown (1870 – August 10, 1948) was a Scottish-American soccer player, executive and coach who had a short tenure as coach of the United States men's national soccer team.

Born in Paisley, Scotland, Brown moved to the U.S. at the age of twenty, settling in Philadelphia to play soccer. He played for Philadelphia Thistle during the 1909-10 Eastern Soccer League season.

He was president of the American Football Association, and was instrumental in that organization's 1913 merger with the American Amateur Association, which formed the United States Football Association.  He later became the president of the USFA, a position he held during the 1928 Soccer Wars.

Brown was posthumously inducted into the National Soccer Hall of Fame in 1950, having died in Ravenna, Ohio on August 10, 1948.

References

External links
NSHOF Bio

1870 births
1948 deaths
Footballers from Paisley, Renfrewshire
Scottish emigrants to the United States
Scottish footballers
Scottish expatriate football managers
American soccer coaches
National Soccer Hall of Fame members
United States men's national soccer team managers
Presidents of the United States Soccer Federation
Association footballers not categorized by position